Nicholas Tufton, 1st Earl of Thanet (1578–1631) was an English peer.

Nicholas Tufton was the son of Sir John Tufton, and Christian Browne, the daughter of Sir Humphrey Browne, Justice of the Common Pleas, by Agnes Hussey, the daughter of John Hussey, 1st Baron Hussey of Sleaford, by his second wife, Anne Grey.

Tufton represented Peterborough in 1601 and Kent from 1624 to 1625 as Member of Parliament. He was knighted by James I on 13 April 1603, and was appointed a justice of the peace in Kent and then a deputy lieutenant in 1623. He succeeded his father in the baronetcy in 1625, was created Baron Tufton, of Tufton, on 1 November 1626, and Earl of the Isle of Thanet on 5 August 1628.

He owned Bodiam Castle, having purchased it in 1623. He was succeeded in the earldom by John Tufton, 2nd Earl of Thanet, his son by his marriage to Lady Frances Cecil, daughter of Thomas Cecil, 1st Earl of Exeter.

Notes

References

|-

1578 births
1631 deaths
Deputy Lieutenants of Kent
English MPs 1601
English MPs 1624–1625
16th-century English nobility
Earls of Thanet
Peers of England created by Charles I